Quinns or Quinn's may refer to:

 Quinns Rocks, Western Australia, a suburb of Perth
 Quinn's Post Commonwealth War Graves Commission Cemetery, near Gallipoli, Turkey

See also
 Quins (disambiguation)
 Quinn (disambiguation)